MCCI may refer to:

 Mother and Child Care Initiative, a public-private partnership in Ebonyi State, Nigeria
 A member of the Comboni Missionaries of the Heart of Jesus, a Roman Catholic religious order
 Maoist Communist Centre of India, an armed Maoist group begun in 1969 which emerged from Dakshin Desh
 1201, a year in the Julian calendar
 Bavarian MCCi, a class of steam railbuses built between 1906 and 1908 in Germany
 Makkah Chamber of Commerce and Industry, a semi-government organization in Saudi Arabia
 Maasin Community Multipurpose Cooperative, a member the National Confederation of Cooperatives in the Philippines
 MCCI Corporation, a developer of USB devices that is a member of the Mobile Imaging and Printing Consortium.
 MCCi, LLC, a value-added software reseller owned by Municipal Code Corporation
 Metropolitan Chamber of Commerce and Industry, Dhaka, oldest and the pre-eminent trade organization of Bangladesh
Madras Chamber of Commerce and Industry